The Caspar CLE 12 was an airliner built in Germany in the early 1920s.

Development
Only one CLE 12 was built, and it took part in the International Air Exhibition in Gothenburg (Sweden) in July 1923.

Specifications

References

1920s German airliners